This is a list of award winners and league leaders for the Melbourne Aces professional baseball team of the Australian Baseball League.

Rookie of the Year

Offensive Player of the Year

Pitcher of the Year

Golden Glove

Most Valuable Player

General Manager's Award

Sponsor of the Year Award

References 

Melbourne Aces